Balloon hoax may refer to:

The Balloon-Hoax (1844)
Balloon boy hoax (2009)